KWNL-CD (channel 14) is a low-power, Class A television station licensed to Bentonville, Arkansas, United States, affiliated with the Spanish-language Univision network. It is owned by Pinnacle Media alongside KFDF-CD and KQRY-LD. KWNL-CD's transmitter is located on South 56th Street in Springdale, Arkansas.

KXUN-LD (channel 48) in Fort Smith operates as a translator of KWNL-CD; this station's transmitter is located on Pernot Road in Van Buren.

History
The call letters were changed from KBBL-CA to KWNL-CA on July 6, 2006. On July 14, 2006, the KBBL-CA call letters reappeared on Channel 56 in Springfield, Missouri, curiously the namesake of the Simpsons' fictional hometown.  However, that station is a translator of KWBM, Equity's MyNetworkTV station in that market, and likely not inspired by the KBBL-TV of The Simpsons.

At one point, KWNL aired local newscasts; they were produced out of Little Rock, Arkansas, with reports produced in Fort Smith. The newscasts were canceled in June 2008, after then-owner Equity Media Holdings instituted a company wide suspension of news programs.

After failing to find a buyer at a bankruptcy auction, KWNL was sold to Pinnacle Media in August 2009 (after having initially been included in Silver Point Finance's acquisition on June 2 of several Equity stations), with Pinnacle assuming control under a local marketing agreement (LMA) on August 5.

Technical information

Subchannels
The station's digital signal is multiplexed:

References

External links

WNL-CD
Equity Media Holdings
Univision network affiliates
Television channels and stations established in 1989
WNL-CD
Low-power television stations in the United States